"Mister and Mississippi" is a popular song, written by Irving Gordon. It was published in 1951 and first recorded by Tennessee Ernie Ford the same year.

Background
The popularity of this song apparently led Gordon, a number of years later, to create another song with even more puns on state names: "Delaware."

Other 1951 recordings
The song was popularized by Patti Page. The Page recording was issued by Mercury Records as catalog number 5645, and first reached the Billboard chart on May 19, 1951, lasting 15 weeks and peaking at number 8.

The recording by Dennis Day was released by RCA Victor Records as catalog number 47-4140. It first reached the Billboard Best Seller chart on June 1, 1951 and lasted 11 weeks on the chart, peaking at number 15.

On Cash Box's charts, where all versions were combined, the song peaked at number 6 on the chart.

Other recordings
It has been recorded by many others, including:
Rex Allen
Eddy Arnold
Johnny Bond & the Cass County Boys
Johnny Desmond

References

Songs written by Irving Gordon
1951 songs
Patti Page songs
Music published by Bourne Co. Music Publishers
Works about the Mississippi River